Niklas Eklund (born 1969) is a Swedish trumpeter. He was born in Gothenburg into a musical family; his father, Bengt, was a noted trumpeter and conductor. Eklund studied with his father, as well as at the School of Music and Musicology of the University of Gothenburg.

Further studies took place under the tutelage of Edward H. Tarr at the Schola Cantorum Basiliensis. After five years as solo trumpeter with the Basel Radio Symphony Orchestra, Eklund left the orchestra in the autumn of 1996 to pursue a solo career. Since then he has appeared with many leading musicians and conductors, including Cecilia Bartoli, Zubin Mehta, John Eliot Gardiner, Heinz Holliger, András Schiff, John Foster, Iván Fischer and Gustav Leonhardt.

In 1996, Eklund won first prize at the first Altenburg International Baroque Trumpet competition, held in Bad Säckingen, Germany.

As a specialist on the notoriously difficult baroque trumpet, he demonstrates exceptional interpretive skill coupled with a high degree of control and precision. Christopher Martin, Principal Trumpet of the New York Philharmonic, says: "Niklas Eklund's Art of the Baroque Trumpet series [on Naxos], is the most lyrically gorgeous trumpet playing you'll ever hear."

Eklund has played an extensive part in the "Bach Pilgrimage" series of performances and recordings directed by Sir John Eliot Gardiner (available on Deutsche Grammophon Archiv CDs), beginning in the year 2000. Besides giving concerts in Sweden and Europe, Eklund has appeared as a guest performer and teacher in the USA, Australia, the Ukraine, Russia and New Zealand (condensed from the artist's website).

References 
Article in the International Trumpet Guild Journal about Eklund's performance at the First International Altenburg Competition in May 1996
Biographical material from Naxos website

Swedish trumpeters
Classical trumpeters
Male trumpeters
1969 births
Living people
Musicians from Gothenburg
Natural trumpet players
21st-century trumpeters
21st-century Swedish male musicians